Misseouta is a village in the Doufelgou Prefecture in the Kara Region of north-eastern Togo. The population of the land misseouta are living from agriculture and breeding. We have different people like Ahoussa, Tem  from differents villages of Togo that live in this village.

References

Populated places in Kara Region
Doufelgou Prefecture